The men's decathlon event at the 2010 Asian Games was held at the Aoti Main Stadium, Guangzhou, China on 24–25 November.

Schedule
All times are China Standard Time (UTC+08:00)

Records

Results 
Legend
DNF — Did not finish
DNS — Did not start

100 metres 
 Wind – Heat 1: +1.3 m/s
 Wind – Heat 2: +1.6 m/s

Long jump

Shot put

High jump

400 metres

110 metres hurdles
 Wind – Heat 1: +0.9 m/s
 Wind – Heat 2: +1.3 m/s

Discus throw

Pole vault

Javelin throw

1500 metres

Summary

References

Results

Athletics at the 2010 Asian Games
2010